Hypoglossum hypoglossoides, known as under tongue weed, is a small red marine alga in the family Delesseriaceae.

Description
Hypoglossum hypoglossoides is a small red alga growing as monostromatic blades in tufts to a length of 30 cm and 0.8 cm wide. The lateral branches grow as blades which, like the primary blade, has a midrib. All the blades have a lanceolate or acute apices. All the blades lack lateral veins.

Reproduction
The plants are dioecious. Spermatangial sori are formed on the blades on either side of the midrib. Cystocarps develop singly on the blades.

Habitat
Found in the littoral and sublittoral on rock or epiphytically on other large algae.

Distribution
Found on the shores of Ireland, Great Britain, Isle of Man and the Channel Islands. Further south in Spain and the Mediterranean, as well as North Carolina to Brazil.

References

Delesseriaceae